Hirbnafsah Subdistrict  is a Syrian nahiyah (subdistrict) located in Hama District in Hama.  According to the Syria Central Bureau of Statistics (CBS), Hirbnafsah Subdistrict had a population of 54592 in the 2004 census.

References 

Hirbnafsah
Hama District